Daniele Mattielig (born 4 March 1980 in Udine, Italy) is an Italian footballer who plays as a midfielder.

External links
 Calcio Portogruaro Summaga Profile
 S. S. Calcio Venezia Profile

1980 births
Living people
Italian footballers
Sportspeople from Udine

Association football midfielders
Footballers from Friuli Venezia Giulia